In mathematics, a binomial ring is a commutative ring whose additive group is torsion-free and contains all binomial coefficients

for x in the ring and n a positive integer.

 showed that binomial rings are essentially the same as λ-rings for which all Adams operations are the identity.

References

Ring theory